The 2016 Travelers Northern Ontario Men's Provincial Championship, the "provincial" men's curling championship of Northern Ontario was held February 10–14 at the North Bay Granite Curling Club in North Bay, Ontario. The winning Brad Jacobs team represented Northern Ontario at the 2016 Tim Hortons Brier in Ottawa.

Teams

Round robin standings

Scores

February 10

Draw 1
Jacobs 8-4 Horgan
Gelinas 7-2 Koivula
Assad 9-6 Gordon
Chandler 10-4 Johnston

Draw 2
Assad 8-7 Johnston
Chandler 6-4 Gordon
Koivula 5-4 Horgan
Jacobs 7-6 Gelinas

February 11

Draw 3
Koivula 7-6 Gordon
Johnston 8-5 Jacobs 
Chandler 6-2 Gelinas
Horgan 7-6 Assad

Draw 4
Assad 8-7 Gelinas 
Horgan 7-2 Chandler
Jacobs 6-3 Gordon
Koivula 7-6 Johnston

February 12

Draw 5
Jacobs 8-3 Chandler
Koivula 8-6 Assad
Johnston 9-3 Gelinas
Horgan 9-6 Gordon

Draw 6
Horgan 9-3 Gelinas
Gordon 8-2 Johnston
Jacobs 9-2 Koivula
Chandler 6-5 Assad

February 13

Draw 7
Chandler 7-0 Koivula
Jacobs 5-2 Assad
Johnston 9-6 Horgan 
Gelinas 6-5 Gordon

Playoffs

Semifinal
Saturday, February 13, 7:30 pm

Final
Sunday, February 14, 2:00 pm

References

2016 Tim Hortons Brier
Curling in Northern Ontario
Travelers Men's NOCA Provincials
Sport in North Bay, Ontario
February 2016 sports events in Canada